Defeasible logic is a non-monotonic logic proposed by Donald Nute to formalize defeasible reasoning. In defeasible logic, there are three different types of propositions:

 strict rules  specify that a fact is always a consequence of another;
 defeasible rules  specify that a fact is typically a consequence of another;
 undercutting defeaters  specify exceptions to defeasible rules.

A priority ordering over the defeasible rules and the defeaters can be given. During the process of deduction, the strict rules are always applied, while a defeasible rule can be applied only if no defeater of a higher priority specifies that it should not.

See also

 Common sense
 Default logic

References

 D. Nute (1994). Defeasible logic. In Handbook of logic in artificial intelligence and logic programming, volume 3: Nonmonotonic reasoning and uncertain reasoning, pages 353–395. Oxford University Press.
 G. Antoniou, D. Billington, G. Governatori, and M. Maher (2001). Representation results for defeasible logic. ACM Transactions on Computational Logic, 2(2):255–287.

Logic programming
Non-classical logic